Bad Tales is a 2020 Italian-Swiss drama film written and directed by Damiano and Fabio D'Innocenzo. It was selected to compete for the Golden Bear in the main competition section at the 70th Berlin International Film Festival, where the D'Innocenzo brothers were awarded with the Silver Bear for Best Screenplay.

Cast
 Elio Germano as Bruno Placido
 Barbara Chichiarelli as Dalila Placido
  as Amelio Guerrini
 Max Malatesta as Pietro Rosa	
 Ileana D'Ambra as Vilma Tommasi
 Lino Musella as Professor Bernardini
 Giulia Melilio as Viola Rosa	
 Justin Korovkin as Geremia Guerrini
 Tommaso Di Cola as Dennis Placido
 Barbara Ronchi
 Giulietta Rebeggiani as Alessia Placido
 Max Tortora as Narrator (voice)

Accolades
Bad Tales won the Jury Prize in International Competition at the 2020 Brussels International Film Festival (BRIFF), ex aequo with Rocks.

References

External links
 

2020 films
2020 drama films
2020s Italian-language films
Italian drama films
Swiss drama films
Films set in Rome
2020s Italian films